Austin Sherry was an Australian professional rugby league footballer who played for Glebe of the New South Wales Rugby League Premiership.

Playing career 
Sherry made his debut for the club in round 16 of the 1923 season against Balmain. He kicked a goal, though his team lost 15–19. Sherry did not play another game until the opening round of the 1925 season. He started at five-eighth and scored the first try of his career to help his team defeat St. George. Two rounds later, he kicked a goal and scored a try in a win against Eastern Suburbs. In Round 10, he kicked 2 goals in a narrow 1-point win over North Sydney. He finished the season with 3 goals and 2 tries in 9 appearances.

Sherry only played one game in the 1926 season. He kicked 5 goals in a win against Newtown. He played the following game - a semi final matchup against Sydney University. Glebe were shocked 3-29 by University - who already had 3 wooden spoons in the last 5 years and had never made a finals appearance prior to the season.

In 1927, Sherry played 5 games for Glebe. He played his last game in a round 8 loss to Newtown. He concluded his career with 2 tries and 9 goals in 17 appearances.

References 

Australian rugby league players
Glebe rugby league players
Rugby league centres
Rugby league halfbacks